This is a list of AM radio stations in the United States having call signs beginning with the letters KA to KF.

KA--

KB--

KC--

KD--

KE--

KF--

See also
 North American call sign

AM radio stations in the United States by call sign (initial letters KA-KF)